Elisabeth Lynn Sikes is an American geoscientist who is a professor at Rutgers University. Her research considers carbon cycling. She was awarded the 2022 Scientific Committee on Antarctic Research Medal for Excellence in Research.

Early life and education 
Sikes was an undergraduate student at Wesleyan University, where she graduated cum laude in environmental sciences. She moved to the University of North Carolina at Chapel Hill for graduate studies. After earning her doctorate, she moved to Massachusetts Institute of Technology, and completed graduate research in geological oceanography at the Woods Hole Oceanographic Institution. Her doctoral research considered the refinement of techniques to estimate paleotemperatures. She was supported by the Australian Research Council to work as a postdoc at the University of Tasmania and University of Auckland.

Research and career 
In 2001, Sikes returned to the United States, where she was appointed to the faculty at Rutgers University. Her research is based in paleoceanography and carbon cycling. She studies circulation in the Southern Ocean, and how those processes trap and release carbon dioxide over glacial timescales. As part of these effort,s she studies temperature changes in the oceans around New Zealand using biomarkers and foramiferally estimates. She has taken part in sixteen oceanographic voyages and serves as Chair of the CLIVAR/CliC/SCAR Southern Ocean Region Panel.

Sikes is also interested in the sources and sinks of terrestrial carbon in modern environments over shorter time scales. For these studies, she makes use of isotope analysis. She investigated how useful the U 37 K 0 index was for estimating paleotemperatures and predicting sea surface temperatures. This included studying whether the 14C ages of alkenones could be used to estimate paleotemperature, as lateral transport can cause these molecules to be several thousand years older than foraminifera found in the same deposit.

Awards and honors 
 2004 National Science Foundation ADVANCE Fellow Award
 2012 Hanse Fellow at the Institute of Advanced Study
 2018 Rutgers University Teaching Excellence award
 2020 American Geophysical Union Cesare Emiliani Lecture Paleoceaongraphy/Paleoclimatology and Ocean Sciences sections Award
 2022 Scientific Committee on Antarctic Research Medal for Excellence in Antarctic Research

Selected publications

References 

Living people
Massachusetts Institute of Technology alumni
University of North Carolina at Chapel Hill alumni
Wesleyan University alumni
Rutgers University faculty
21st-century American geologists
Year of birth missing (living people)